Chabbie may refer to:

Chabbie Charlery, cricketer
 Chabbie River